The three-dart average in darts is the average score achieved with three darts thrown.

Averages are the most cited statistics in matches as they give a rough estimate of a player's form. The longer a match lasts, the harder it is to maintain a high average as low scoring legs or missed darts at a double bring the average down.

While there have been match averages of over 130 in floor tournaments, the world record only lists televised matches, which are easy to verify.

History
Michael van Gerwen is the current world record holder for a televised match with an average of 123.40 thrown in the 2016 Premier League against Michael Smith.

Peter Wright holds the record for highest Professional Darts Corporation live streamed match average (123.53), at Players Championship 29 in 2019.

Bobby George was the first player to throw an average of over 100 on television during the 1979 News of the World Darts Championship final against Alan Glazier.

Televised high averages

Men
Televised averages of 114 points or more.

Women

Televised high averages world record progression

Men
The world record progression before 1997 is subject to further research.

Women

Televised pairs high averages

Televised combined high averages

Highest televised averages by length of match in legs

This table shows the highest average for all matches containing at least as many legs as the number in the leftmost column. Set-play matches show the total number of legs won and lost across all sets.

Highest tournament winning averages
Note: These tournament averages were calculated by adding up the match averages and then dividing by the number of matches. The "true" tournament averages - which would be calculated by adding up the points scored divided by total darts thrown and multiplying by 3 - may differ, but cannot be accurately calculated for most tournaments due to this data being unavailable.

References

External links
 High Averages on PDPA Professional Darts Player Association
 Highest Averages on TV on The Darts Forum
 Darts Averages on OnAverage
 Darts Averages on Darts1
 TV Averages +105 on The Stars Of Darts Forum

Darts terminology
Lists of darts players
Sports records and statistics
Superlatives in sports